INP may stand for:

INP (database), an early database system developed at the University of California, Berkeley
Integrated National Police, a forerunner of the Philippine National Police
Illinois Newspaper Project
Industry and Business Party (Industri- og Næringspartiet), a Norwegian political party 
Budker Institute of Nuclear Physics
National Polytechnic Institutes (France)
Peruvian Navy (ICAO air service code: INP), see List of airline codes (P)
Iñapari language (ISO 639 language code: inp)
Indium phosphide (InP)
InPage (file extension: .inp) a word processor and page layout program
EPANET (file extension: .inp) a geographic information system for modelling water distribution systems
Ice nucleaction particle

See also

INP10, a protein

1-NP (disambiguation)
INPS (disambiguation)
IPN (disambiguation)
NP (disambiguation)
LNP (disambiguation)
nip (disambiguation)
NPI (disambiguation)
PNI (disambiguation)
pin (disambiguation)